Datnioides polota, commonly known as the silver tigerfish or four-banded tiger perch, is a species of datnioidid fish native to brackish and fresh waters near the coast like mangrove, lagoons, estuaries and lower parts of rivers from northeastern India, through Bangladesh and mainland southeast Asia, to Sumatra and Borneo. Although sometimes reported from New Guinea, this population is now recognized as D. campbelli.

References

Percoidei
Fish of Thailand
Fish described in 1822